The Marenica project is a modest Uranium resource located in the western part of Namibia in Erongo Region. Marenica represents a uranium resource of 22,000 tU in ore grading 0.008% uranium. Marenica Minerals, the company that owns the rights to the resource, has put all further development on hold as its majority shareholder Marenica Energy seeks to develop and market a process for extracting uranium from low-grade ore.

References 

Uranium mines in Namibia